DHA Valley is a subdivision of Defence, Islamabad.

  About 110,000 civilians, 41,000 serving and retired military officers and families of martyrs. The total land of 165,000 kanals.

Plots will be given to alloties in December 2022 as per new plan given by administration after paying up fee of Development charges.

Details 
DHA Valley is a joint venture between DHA Islamabad, Bahria Town, and Habib Rafiq. The plan includes a secure community with parks, utilities, commercial shopping, schools, mosques, and a hospital. The project's master plan was designed by the California-based company OJMR Architects. Habib Rafiq is responsible for the transportation infrastructure, while construction of DHA Homes was awarded to the Turkish company AREA. The master plan includes the following projects DHA Valley, DHA Valley (Overseas Block), DHA Homes and DHA Commercial Avenue The project launched in November 2008 and should have been completed by the end of 2014.New re-balloting have been done on 23 Dec and can be seen at https://www.dhai-r.com.pk/index.php/main-menu/dha-phases/dha-valley/ballot-result-dha-valley

In 2018, The National Accountability Bureau (NAB)initiated investigations against administrations of Defence Housing Authority (DHA) Islamabad, Bahria Town and Capital Development Authority (CDA) for over Rs62 billion DHA Valley and its Phase-II (extension) scams.

110,000 civilians, and 41,000 serving and retired military officers and families of martyrs were cheated and suffered losses Due to non delivery of land to the allottees. The total land in question is of 165,000 kanals.

Controversies

Kamran Kayani 
Kamran Kayani, brother of former Chief of Army Staff Ashfaq Parvez Kayani, is allegedly involved in a number of land scams including DHA Valley. The corruption watchdog National Accountability Bureau (NAB) investigated Kamran Kayani and later issued his arrest warrants.

Corruption allegations 
On 2 February 2011, a complaint was lodged with National Accountability Bureau (NAB) against the management of DHA Valley. The complainant Lt. Col. Tariq Kamal accused the management of DHA Valley of embezzlement in sale, development, and purchase of land in the subdivision. On the directions of Supreme Court of Pakistan, NAB submitted a list of 179 cases before the court. The list also included the DHA Valley case. Later, the same list was uploaded on NAB's website. The status of the DHA Valley case in NAB is "inquiry under progress", as of January 27, 2017.

Dadhocha Dam 
On 3 August 2015, a report was submitted to the Supreme Court on behalf of the Punjab Irrigation Department. The submitted report assured the Supreme Court that Dadhocha Dam would be built at the original site. The original site of Dadhocha dam had been included in the master plan of DHA Valley. On 27 January 2016, the district administration of Rawalpindi told the Punjab Irrigation Department to start constructing the stalled Dadhocha Dam to end its tussle with the Defence, Islamabad-Rawalpindi.

See also 
 Defence Housing Authority
 Bahria Town
 Capital Development Authority
 Developments in Islamabad

References

External links 
 DHA Valley Official Website

Defence, Islamabad-Rawalpindi